Leslie Coffey (9 September 1936 – 3 March 2018) was an Australian sports shooter. He competed in the 50 metre pistol event at the 1964 Summer Olympics.

References

1936 births
2018 deaths
Australian male sport shooters
Olympic shooters of Australia
Shooters at the 1964 Summer Olympics
Place of birth missing